Markelle is a given name. Notable people with the name include:

Markelle Fultz (born 1998), American basketball player
Markelle Martin (born 1990), American football player

See also
Markel (name)
Markell, given name and surname

Masculine given names